The Triestine dialect is a dialect of Venetian spoken in the city of Trieste.

The lexicon of Triestine is mostly of Latin origin. However, there are also words taken from other languages. As Trieste borders with Slovenia and was under the Habsburg monarchy for almost six centuries, some words are of German and Slovene origin. Due to extensive emigration to the city in the late 18th and 19th centuries, some words also came from other languages, such as Greek and Serbo-Croatian.

Development

After the expansion of the Republic of Venice, from the Middle Ages onwards, Venetian gradually asserted itself as a lingua franca in parts of the Eastern Mediterranean and in the Adriatic Sea, eventually replacing or strongly influencing several coastal languages such as the dialects of Trieste and Istria and also the Dalmatian dialects of Zara (Zadar) and Ragusa (Dubrovnik). In Trieste, this resulted in the gradual replacement of the former Tergestine dialect (related to Friulian within the Rhaetian subgroup of Romance languages) and of the neighbouring Slovene dialects by a Venetian-based language. This phenomenon began to take place first among fishermen and sailors, while the traditional bourgeoisie continued to speak Tergestine until the beginning of the 19th century. By that time, Tergestine was virtually a dead language, and the period of Modern Triestine had begun.

Literature
Several prominent authors have used the Triestine dialect, such as Umberto Saba and Virgilio Giotti. Giotti, a prominent Italian dialect poet, is credited as the greatest Triestine dialect poet.

Example 

Dialogue from Carpinteri e Faraguna. Noi delle vecchie provincie (Trieste, La Cittadella, 1971).

Triestine dialect:

Àle, àle, siora Nina, che el sol magna le ore!
No per vù, me par, sior Bortolo che sé qua sempre in gamba a contarne una roba e l'altra, tuto de tuti ... anca quel che se gavemo dismentigado...
Memoria, graziando Idio, no me ga mai mancado. Ma el mal xe che el sol magna le ore e le ore, pian pian, ne magna anca a nualtri!
Ma disème la sinzera verità: quanti ani gavé vù, sior Bortolo?
Indiferente. No conta i ani che se ga fato, conta quei che resta...

Italian:

Alé, alé, signora Nina, che il sole mangia le ore!
Non per Voi, mi pare, signor Bortolo che siete qui sempre in gamba a raccontarci una cosa e l'altra, tutto di tutti… anche quello che ci siamo dimenticati…
Di memoria, ringraziando Iddio, non me n'è mai mancata. Ma il male è che il sole mangia le ore e le ore, pian piano, mangiano anche noi!
Ma ditemi la sincera verità: quanti anni avete Voi, signor Bortolo?
Non importa. Non contano gli anni che si sono compiuti, contano quelli che restano…

Sample vocabulary

References 

Culture in Trieste
Venetian language
City colloquials